Magic Steps is the opening book of The Circle Opens quartet of young adult fantasy novels by Tamora Pierce. It is preceded by the Circle of Magic quartet, taking place four years after the conclusion of Briar's Book. It portrays the adventures of Sandrilene fa Toren, the noble thread mage and her first experience as a teacher of magic.

Plot
Like the previous quartet, Magic Steps is set in Summersea, the capital of Emelan. When her three foster-siblings leave Summersea to travel the world with their teachers, Sandry and Lark, remain alone in a Temple. Sandry leaves Discipline Cottage to live with and care for him.

While out riding with her uncle, Sandry makes two discoveries: the murder of Rokat part of the war between organized crime families Rokat and Dihanur, and a boy named Pasco, whose dancing is visible to Sandry's magical vision as imbued with ambient magic.

Publication and reception 
The book was first published in 2000, one year after Briar's Book concluded the original Circle of Magic quartet in 1999. Kirkus praised the book's "vibrant language" and "great energy."

It was adapted into an audiobook in 2011 by Full Cast Audio.

References

American fantasy novels
Emelanese books
2000 American novels
2000 fantasy novels
American young adult novels